Turkovčina is a village in the municipality of Bedenica in Zagreb County, Croatia.

The village has 334 inhabitants in the 2011 census.

References

Populated places in Zagreb County